Satbir Singh (born 22 October 1993) is an Indian field hockey player who plays as a midfielder. He plays for Punjab Warriors in the Hockey India League.

References

External links
Player profile at Hockey India

1993 births
Living people
People from Gurdaspur district
Indian male field hockey players
Field hockey players from Punjab, India
Male field hockey midfielders